Haraldsson is a surname of Icelandic or Swedish origin, meaning son of Harald or son of Haraldur. Its Danish and Norwegian equivalent is Haraldsen. In Icelandic names, the name is not strictly a surname, but a patronymic. The name refers to:

Godfrid Haraldsson (820–856), son of the Danish king Harald Klak
Guttorm Haraldsson (fl. 10th century), son of king Harald Fairhair of Norway
Sigvaldi Strut-Haraldsson (fl. 11th–12th century), chieftain of the Jomsvikings
Björn Ironside Haraldsson (fl. 12th century), Danish noble; father of Christina Bjornsdatter, a queen of Sweden
Erlend Haraldsson (fl. 12th century), Earl of Orkney 1151–54
David Haraldsson (fl. 13th century), Earl of Orkney 1206–14
Heinrik Haraldsson (fl. 13th century), Earl of Orkney 1206–31
Jon Haraldsson (fl. 13th century), Earl of Orkney 1206–31
Erlendur Haraldsson (contemporary), Icelandic academic; professor of psychology and philosophy
Daníel Ágúst Haraldsson (born 1969), Icelandic pop singer
Solveig Haraldsson (1939-1994 or 1995), Swedish chess master
Börje Haraldsson (born 1957), Swedish physician and researcher
 Hákon Arnar Haraldsson (born 2003), Icelandic footballer

See also
Haralson (surname)

Swedish-language surnames
Patronymic surnames
Surnames from given names